SPURS National Honor Society (Service, Patriotism, Unity, Responsibility, and Sacrifice) was a collegiate sophomore honor society which disbanded in 2005. Several chapters remain in operation independently.

History
SPURS was founded at Montana State University at Bozeman as an honor society for Sophomore women in 1922.  Chapters were spread across the United States, primarily at smaller colleges and universities and emphasis remained on community service and scholarship.

Originally a women-only organization, SPURS became co-educational in 1976.

Surviving chapters

MSU Bozeman chapter 
The MSU SPURS that were left decided to join with the MSU Student Alumni Association the following the year  (as did the dissolved society "Fangs"—a branch from the Intercollegiate Knights).  With this team up, MSU's student alumni association-"SPURS and Fangs"- is in rapid development.

Linfield College Chapter 
After the dissolution of the national organization, the SPURS chapter at Linfield College in McMinnville, Oregon decided to remain an honor society dedicated to the founding ideals.  The club expanded to include juniors and seniors, abandoning its sophomore-only rule. The Linfield chapter may now be dormant.

University of Arizona Chapter 
Students at the UofA reinstalled SPURS as a club in 2017 and has been a recognized club by the Associated Students of the University of Arizona since. “The purpose of SPURS shall be to offer service to the University, the surrounding community, and region...and to foster among all students a spirit of loyalty, helpfulness, and academic excellence.”

Chapter List

References

External links 
 Montana State University Archives SPURS National Honor Society records, 1922-2006

Honor societies
Service organizations based in the United States
Defunct fraternities and sororities
Student organizations established in 1922
Organizations disestablished in 2006
1922 establishments in Montana